"Grove St. Party" is the fourth single by American rapper Waka Flocka Flame, which was released February 15, 2011 under the record label 1017 Brick Squad Records. It features rapper Kebo Gotti and is the fourth single from his debut album Flockaveli, which was released on October 5, 2010.  The song was produced by Lex Luger.

Music video
A music video for "Grove St. Party" premiered on MTV on April 8, 2011. Waka Flocka Flame, Kebo Gotti, and fellow rapper/Brick Squad CEO Gucci Mane appear in the video, which shows Waka departing a tour bus and making his way through a party of green lights which includes a dancing neon green Fozi Bear. Also, rapper YC appears in the video performing his "Racks" dance.

Remix
Lil Wayne made a remix for his mixtape Sorry 4 the Wait, which features rapper Lil B. Prodigy of Mobb Deep released a remix called "It's a Body". Wiz Khalifa released a remix called "Reefer Party". Ace Hood also did a freestyle for the song.

Chart performance
On the week ending February 27, 2011, "Grove St. Party" debuted at number 38 on the U.S. Billboard R&B/Hip-Hop Tracks chart. Since then it has reached a current peak of number 12, and reached number 10 on the Rap Songs chart. After two weeks of being on the Bubbling Under Hot 100 Singles chart, the song debuted on the U.S. Billboard Hot 100 at number 93, and in its next week on the chart, it propelled to number 82, and stayed there for its third week. The song has reached number 74 on the chart, and is Kebo Gotti's first and only charting song.

Charts

Weekly charts

Year-end charts

References

2009 songs
2011 singles
Waka Flocka Flame songs
Song recordings produced by Lex Luger (musician)
Songs written by Waka Flocka Flame
Asylum Records singles
Warner Records singles
Songs written by Lex Luger (musician)